Backdraft is the second studio album from Fallstar, released by Facedown Records on April 16, 2013. Fallstar worked with Kris Crummett in the production of this album.

Critical reception

Awarding the album four stars from HM Magazine, Sarah Brehm states, "Fallstar’s Backdraft is metalcore at its heart, but still seamlessly pulls from a myriad of genres—melodic hardcore, punk, rap-rock, electronic—to create an album that’s hard not to like." Mark Sherwoood, rating the album a seven out of ten for Cross Rhythms, writes, "overall a strongish album." Giving the album four and a half stars at Jesus Freak Hideout, Michael Weaver says, "Fallstar has produced a solid product in Backdraft." Timothy Estabrooks, awarding the album four stars for Jesus Freak Hideout, states, "Backdraft is a phenomenal release from a band that really deserves a lot of recognition right now." Lee Brown, giving the album four stars at Indie Vision Music, writes, "With Backdraft, they have grown musically, vocally, and as song writers." Rating the album a four out of ten from Exclaim!, says, the band "stray from having any significant singles or memorable solos rise to the forefront, although the album as a whole stands against the grain within their particular genre."

Track listing

Credits
Fallstar
Chris Ratzlaff - vocals
Justin Raymond Haag - guitar
Jason Brown - guitar
Bryan Ratzlaff- bass
Cody Carrier - drums

Production
Kris Crummett

References

2013 albums
Fallstar albums
Facedown Records albums
Albums produced by Kris Crummett